The 2000–01 WHL season was the 35th season for the Western Hockey League.  Eighteen teams completed a 72-game season.  The Red Deer Rebels won the President's Cup before going on to win the Memorial Cup.

Regular season

Final standings

Scoring leaders
Note: GP = Games played; G = Goals; A = Assists; Pts = Points; PIM = Penalties in minutes

Goaltending Leaders
Note: GP = Games played; Min = Minutes played; W = Wins; L = Losses; T = Ties ; GA = Goals against; SO = Total shutouts; SV% = Save percentage; GAA = Goals against average

2001 WHL Playoffs

Conference quarterfinals

Eastern Conference

Western Conference

Conference semifinals

Conference finals

WHL Championship

All-Star game

On January 24, the WHL Eastern All-stars were defeated by  the OHL Western All-stars 5–2 at Guelph, Ontario before a crowd of 5,074.

On January 31, the WHL Western All-stars were defeated by the QMJHL Dilio All-stars 7–5 at Kamloops, British Columbia before a crowd of 4,103.

WHL awards

All-Star Teams

source: Western Hockey League press release

See also
2001 Memorial Cup
2001 NHL Entry Draft
2000 in sports
2001 in sports

References
whl.ca
 2005–06 WHL Guide

Western Hockey League seasons
WHL
WHL